Michael Kanteena (born September 1, 1959) is a potter from Laguna Pueblo, New Mexico. He is best known for his pottery inspired by Chaco, Mesa Verde and other Ancestral Pueblo pottery. Kanteena also makes pottery inspired by historic kachina dolls and kachina masks. His work has been displayed in the Maxwell Museum in Albuquerque, the Wheelwright Museum in Santa Fe, and at many commercial galleries. Kanteena also shows his work at the annual Santa Fe Indian Market.

Kanteena earned a bachelor's degree in Fine Arts from Eastern New Mexico University in 1981. He lives and works in Laguna, New Mexico. He has taught pottery-making at the Crow Canyon Archaeological Center  in southwest Colorado.

Honors and awards
New Mexico State Fair, first place award, 1994
Gallup Ceremonial: first, second and third place awards, 1995; first place award, 1996
Wingspread Collectors' Guide Award of Excellence, 1998
Feature article in the January, 2001 issue of New Mexico Magazine

See also
Native American pottery
Ancestral Puebloans

References

External links
Michael Kanteena pottery
Kantena's Owak'tsinam, Coal Kachina

1959 births
Living people
Artists from New Mexico
Native American potters
Laguna Pueblo
Pueblo artists
20th-century Native Americans
21st-century Native Americans